Carl Thomas Curtis (March 15, 1905 – January 24, 2000) was an American attorney and politician from the U.S. state of Nebraska. He served as a Republican in the United States House of Representatives (1939–1954) and later the United States Senate (1955–1979). He remains the second longest-serving Senator from Nebraska.

Early life

Curtis was born on his family's farm in Kearney County, Nebraska, near the county seat of Minden. He attended public schools and later attended Nebraska Wesleyan University, where he was a member of Theta Chi. He studied law on his own, passed the bar exam, and began practicing; he served as the county attorney of Kearney County, Nebraska, from 1931 to 1934.

Career

Curtis was elected to the House of Representatives in 1938 on an anti-New Deal platform. He served from 1939 until 1954, being reelected every two years. He ran for the Senate from Nebraska in 1954 and won; subsequently, incumbent Hazel Abel resigned, and Curtis was appointed to the seat on January 1, 1955, getting a two-day jump on seniority. Curtis thus became the last of six Senators to serve during the fifteenth Senate term for Nebraska's Class 2 seat, from January 3, 1949 to January 3, 1955. He was reelected three more times to six-year terms, serving from 1955 to 1979.

Curtis voted in favor of the Civil Rights Acts of 1957, 1960, 1964, and 1968, as well as the 24th Amendment to the U.S. Constitution, the Voting Rights Act of 1965, and the confirmation of Thurgood Marshall to the U.S. Supreme Court. Curtis was loyal to the Republican Party, particularly supporting its anti-communist stances and fiscal conservatism, which included opposition to social programs such as the New Deal and the Great Society.

During the 1963 investigation of bribery allegations against Democratic Party organizer Robert Baker, Curtis supposedly leaked a secret memorandum to advance his own positions.

A close ally of both Barry Goldwater and Richard Nixon, Curtis served as floor leader during the 1964 Republican National Convention, when Goldwater won the nomination.

During the early 1970s, Curtis supported President Richard Nixon's Vietnam War escalation policy, and remained loyal to him throughout the Watergate Scandal. On August 6, 1974, two days before Nixon resigned, he implored Congress not to panic. He warned that the United States would become like a "banana republic" if Nixon was ousted in favor of Vice President Ford, who in turn would then select someone to fill the vice presidential slot. He said "this would mean both Ford and the new Vice President would be men who hadn't been elected to their high office, but merely nominated by a President under procedures for filling the vice presidency when it is vacant."

Curtis served as chairman of the Senate Republican Conference from 1975 to 1979.

Later life

Following his retirement, Curtis moved to Lincoln, Nebraska, where he practiced law, served as an officer of the conservative lobby the American Freedom Coalition, and gave occasional interviews to the media.

Curtis died in Lincoln on January 24, 2000, and is interred at Minden Cemetery in Minden, his longtime hometown. Following his death, he was praised on the floor by Strom Thurmond, a contemporary who had also been first elected to the Senate in 1954.

Notes and references

External links

The Political Graveyard

|-

|-

|-

|-

|-

1905 births
2000 deaths
Nebraska lawyers
Nebraska Wesleyan University alumni
People from Kearney County, Nebraska
Republican Party United States senators from Nebraska
Republican Party members of the United States House of Representatives from Nebraska
Old Right (United States)
20th-century American lawyers
20th-century American politicians
People from Minden, Nebraska